The Employment Rights (Dispute Resolution) Act 1998 (c 8) is a United Kingdom Act of Parliament which regulates UK labour law. The 1998 Act empowered the Advisory, Conciliation and Arbitration Service (ACAS) to create arbitration hearings as an alternative dispute resolution mechanism to the employment tribunals.

Overview
The 1998 Act inserted the right under the Employment Rights Act 1996 section 203(5) which allows parties to a dismissal case to agree in writing that the dispute be referred to arbitration. This can result from a settlement negotiation of an ACAS conciliation officer. ACAS will supply, though not appoint, an arbitrator. If a dispute goes to arbitration, the advantage can be perceived to be finality, in that the arbitration decision is binding and not capable of appeal to the Employment Appeal Tribunal or otherwise. Only if the arbitration decision manifests serious irregularity (per incuriam) or acts beyond its jurisdiction or power (ultra vires) is there a right to challenge the decision under the Arbitration Act 1996.

In practice
In 2003 to 2004 the number of tribunal claims was around 50,000 each year. The number of disputes attracted to arbitration under the 1998 Act scheme was 7.

See also
UK labour law

Notes

External links
Text at OPSI

United Kingdom labour law
United Kingdom Acts of Parliament 1998
1998 in labor relations